Talbot railway station is located on the Mildura line in Victoria, Australia. It serves the town of Talbot, and opened on 2 February 1875.

The station closed on 12 September 1993, when The Vinelander service to Mildura was withdrawn and replaced by road coaches. When rail passenger services from Ballarat to Maryborough resumed in July 2010, Talbot station was not reopened. In February 2010, the crossing loop and siding were abolished.

In November 2010, the State Government announced the station would reopen, and that occurred on 22 December 2013.

In 2016-2017, the station was one of the least-patronised in Victoria, with annual passenger movements of 1,121, or about 3.07 passengers a day. In 2020-2021, the station recorded the second-lowest patronage in the state with 350 passenger movements - less than one passenger a day.

Platforms and services
Talbot has one platform. It is served by V/Line Maryborough line trains.

Platform 1:
 services to Maryborough and Ballarat

Transport Links
V/Line operates road coach services via Talbot station, from Melbourne and Ballarat to Donald and Mildura

References

External links
Rail Geelong gallery
Victorian Railway Stations gallery
Melway map at street-directory.com.au

Railway stations in Australia opened in 1875
Regional railway stations in Victoria (Australia)